is a railway station operated by JR West on the Gantoku Line in Kudamatsu, Yamaguchi.

Adjacent stations
West Japan Railway (JR West)

History 

May 29, 1932: Station opens, in what was then Hanaoka Village
April 1, 1987: Station operation is taken over by JR West after privatization of Japanese National Railways

See also
 List of railway stations in Japan

External links
  

Railway stations in Japan opened in 1932
Railway stations in Yamaguchi Prefecture